Bandys High School is a public, coeducational high school located in Catawba, North Carolina, United States.  It is part of the Catawba County Schools district.

Athletics
Bandys is classified as a 2A school by the North Carolina High School Athletic Association (NCHSAA) and is a member of the Catawba Valley Athletic Conference.  Bandys' primary rival is Maiden High School.

Achievements
Bandys fields sports teams in baseball, basketball, cheerleading, marching band, cross country, football, golf, soccer, softball, tennis, track and field, volleyball, and wrestling. The marching band represented North Carolina in the 1993 Presidential Inaugural Parade.

Bandys has won the following team NCHSAA state championships:

 2A Men's Basketball – 1982
 3A Women's Basketball – 1977
 2A Women's Basketball – 1981, 1982, 1987, 1988, 1994
 1A/2A Softball – 1985
 1A/2A Wrestling State Tournament – 2004, 2005, 2006
 2A Wrestling State Dual Team – 2005, 2006, 2022
 2A Wrestling State Tournament – 2022

Notable alumni
Shane Burton, NFL defensive tackle
Justin Harper, NFL wide receiver
Bryan Harvey, MLB pitcher and 2x All-Star selection 
Hunter Harvey, MLB pitcher and son of Bryan Harvey
Jesse Little, professional stock car racing driver
Bobby Lutz, basketball coach
Adam Scherr, professional wrestler in the WWE under the ring name Braun Strowman
Mitchell Setzer, North Carolina state representative

References

Public high schools in North Carolina
Educational institutions established in 1953
Schools in Catawba County, North Carolina
1953 establishments in North Carolina